The 1966 Iowa Hawkeyes football team represented the University of Iowa in the 1966 Big Ten Conference football season. Led by first-year head coach Ray Nagel, the Hawkeyes compiled an overall record of 2–8 with a mark of 1–6 in conference play, placing last in the Big Ten. The team played home games at Iowa Stadium in Iowa City, Iowa.

Schedule

Game summaries

Arizona

at Purdue

at Michigan State

at Miami (FL)

References

Iowa
Iowa Hawkeyes football seasons
Iowa Hawkeyes football